The 1971–72 Swedish Division I season was the 28th season of Swedish Division I. Brynas IF won the league title by finishing first in the final round.

First round

Northern Group

Southern Group

Qualification round

Northern Group

Southern Group

Final round

External links
 1971–72 season

Swedish
Swedish Division I seasons 
1971–72 in Swedish ice hockey